Cruelty is a 1959 Soviet dramatic film directed by Vladimir Skuybin and written by Pavel Nilin.

Synopsis
Set in the vicinity of a small Siberian town, the film centers around a brutal gang led by the character Kostya Vorontsov. The local police, assisted by members of the Komsomol, investigate the operations of the gang and attempt to liquidate them.

In one of the clashes with the bandits, the deputy head of the investigation, Veniamin Malyshev (a Komsomol member of the Civil War) is seriously wounded. In addition, Vorontsov's assistant Lazar Baukin (a former hunter and a soldier), is captured. Having ascertained during the interrogation that the gangster did not intend to help the policemen, the head of the criminal investigation department proposes to shoot the enemy. This is in accordance with the laws of revolutionary times. Suddenly, the wounded Malyshev intervenes, deciding that Baukin is a lost man who can be re-educated.

A complex drama of character unfolds and ends with the suicide of Malyshev, who believes that it is impossible to live with a lie. The young policeman could not stand the contrast between revolutionary ideals and the activities of careerists and demagogues.

Cast
 Georgi Yumatov as  Malyshev
 Apollon Yachnitsky as Kostya Vorontsov
 Boris Andreyev as Lazar Baukin
 Nikolai Kryuchkov as Yefrem Yefremovich, head of criminal investigation
 Vladimir Andreyev as Yakov Uzelkov
 Anatoly Kubatsky as charioteer
 Nikolay Smorchkov as Tsaritsyn
 Margarita Zhigunova as Julia Maltseva

Release
In 1959, the film was watched by 29 million Soviet viewers, placing it 415th in the history of rentals.

Notes

References

External links
  
  
 Cruelty  on KinoPoisk 

Soviet drama films
1959 drama films
1959 films
Russian Civil War films
Mosfilm films
Films based on Russian novels
Soviet black-and-white films
1950s Russian-language films